Periša Pešukić (born 7 December 1997) is a Montenegrin professional footballer who plays as a right-back for Novi Pazar.

Club career
On 28 December 2018, Pešukić joined Budućnost. After only six months at Budućnost, he officially joined Serbian club Partizan on 14 June 2019. On 18 August 2019, he made his league debut for Partizan under coach Savo Milošević in a 3–0 victory against Rad. However, Pešukić did not play another competitive match for the rest of the year. He was then loaned back to Budućnost in time to participate in the team's winter training camp.

International career
In 2018, Pešukić debuted for the Montenegrin national U21 team and has been capped a total of four times.

Honours
Budućnost
 Montenegrin Cup: 2018–19

References

External links
 Periša Pešukić profile at partizan.rs

1997 births
Living people
Footballers from Podgorica
Association football fullbacks
Montenegrin footballers
Montenegro under-21 international footballers
FK Zeta players
FK Bratstvo Cijevna players
FK Rudar Pljevlja players
FK Budućnost Podgorica players
FK Partizan players
Montenegrin First League players
Montenegrin Second League players
Serbian SuperLiga players
Montenegrin expatriate footballers
Expatriate footballers in Serbia
Montenegrin expatriate sportspeople in Serbia